Didymus (Greek for "twin") may refer to:

People

Didymus
 Arius Didymus (fl. 1st century BC), Stoic philosopher
 Thomas the Apostle (died 72 AD), also known as Didymus
 Didymus Chalcenterus (63 BC–10 AD), Hellenistic scholar and grammarian
 Didymus the Blind (313–398), ecclesiastical writer of Alexandria
 Didymus the Musician, music theorist in Alexandria of the 1st century
 St Didymus (died 304), 4th century companion of StTheodora
 Didymus, a member of the House of Theodosius
 Didymus Mutasa (born 1935), Minister of National Security in Zimbabwe

Didymos
 Didymos (music theorist), ancient Greek music theorist
 Didymos I (1921–2014), Catholicos of the East and Malankara Metropolitan, the Primate of the Malankara Church of India from 2005 to 2010.

Fictional characters
 Sir Didymus, a fictional character from the movie Labyrinth

Animals 
 Didymus (beetle), a genus of weevils found in New Zealand, the Kermadec and Norfolk Islands
 Leptodactylus didymus, a species of frog in Bolivia and Peru

See also

 
 Didimus, a genus of beetle
 
 Didymos (disambiguation)